ES Guitars is an American guitar manufacturer of electric guitars and bass guitars. Established in 2003, the company manufactures guitars in Connecticut but the main office is located in New York. The company focuses on Heavy Metal and Hard Rock guitars.

The main artist that used ES Guitars was Anders Nyström of the Swedish band Bloodbath. The guitar was used on Bloodbath’s “The Wacken Carnage" DVD.

The company went our of business in 2015.

Guitar Models
The company has several guitar and bass models such as the ES-86, ES- 87 and Metal Dagger.

References

External links

Musical instrument manufacturing companies based in New York City
Companies established in 2003
Guitar manufacturing companies of the United States
Companies disestablished in 2015